In mechanics and geometry, the 3D rotation group, often denoted SO(3), is the group of all rotations about the origin of three-dimensional Euclidean space  under the operation of composition.

By definition, a rotation about the origin is a transformation that preserves the origin, Euclidean distance (so it is an isometry), and orientation (i.e., handedness of space). Composing two rotations results in another rotation, every rotation has a unique inverse rotation, and the identity map satisfies the definition of a rotation. Owing to the above properties (along composite rotations' associative property), the set of all rotations is a group under composition.

Every non-trivial rotation is determined by its axis of rotation (a line through the origin) and its angle of rotation. Rotations are not commutative (for example, rotating R 90° in the x-y plane followed by S 90° in the y-z plane is not the same as S followed by R), making the 3D rotation group a nonabelian group. Moreover, the rotation group has a natural structure as a manifold for which the group operations are smoothly differentiable, so it is in fact a Lie group. It is compact and has dimension 3.

The group SO(3) can therefore be identified with the group of these matrices under matrix multiplication. These matrices are known as "special orthogonal matrices", explaining the notation SO(3).

The group SO(3) is used to describe the possible rotational symmetries of an object, as well as the possible orientations of an object in space. Its representations are important in physics, where they give rise to the elementary particles of integer spin.

Length and angle
Besides just preserving length, rotations also preserve the angles between vectors. This follows from the fact that the standard dot product between two vectors u and v can be written purely in terms of length:

It follows that every length-preserving linear transformation in  preserves the dot product, and thus the angle between vectors. See classical group for a treatment of this more general approach, where  appears as a special case.

Orthogonal and rotation matrices

Like any linear transformation of finite-dimensional vector spaces, a rotation can always be represented by a matrix. Let  be a given rotation. Since the standard basis is orthonormal, and since  preserves angles and length, the columns of  form another orthonormal basis. This orthonormality condition can be expressed in the form

Matrices for which this property holds are called orthogonal matrices. The group of all  orthogonal matrices is denoted , and consists of all proper and improper rotations.

In addition to preserving length, proper rotations must also preserve orientation. A matrix will preserve or reverse orientation according to whether the determinant of the matrix is positive or negative. For an orthogonal matrix , note that  implies , so that . The subgroup of orthogonal matrices with determinant  is called the special orthogonal group, denoted .

Thus every rotation can be represented uniquely by an orthogonal matrix with unit determinant. Moreover, since composition of rotations corresponds to matrix multiplication, the rotation group is isomorphic to the special orthogonal group .

Improper rotations correspond to orthogonal matrices with determinant , and they do not form a group because the product of two improper rotations is a proper rotation.

Group structure
The rotation group is a group under function composition (or equivalently the product of linear transformations). It is a subgroup of the general linear group consisting of all invertible linear transformations of the real 3-space .

Furthermore, the rotation group is nonabelian. That is, the order in which rotations are composed makes a difference. For example, a quarter turn around the positive x-axis followed by a quarter turn around the positive y-axis is a different rotation than the one obtained by first rotating around y and then x.

The orthogonal group, consisting of all proper and improper rotations, is generated by reflections. Every proper rotation is the composition of two reflections, a special case of the Cartan–Dieudonné theorem.

Axis of rotation

Each such rotation acts as an ordinary 2-dimensional rotation in the plane orthogonal to this axis. Since every 2-dimensional rotation can be represented by an angle φ, an arbitrary 3-dimensional rotation can be specified by an axis of rotation together with an angle of rotation about this axis. (Technically, one needs to specify an orientation for the axis and whether the rotation is taken to be clockwise or counterclockwise with respect to this orientation).

For example, counterclockwise rotation about the positive z-axis by angle φ is given by

Then

 R(0, n) is the identity transformation for any n
 R(φ, n) = R(−φ, −n)
 R( + φ, n) = R( − φ, −n).

Using these properties one can show that any rotation can be represented by a unique angle φ in the range 0 ≤ φ ≤  and a unit vector n such that
 n is arbitrary if φ = 0
 n is unique if 0 < φ < 
 n is unique up to a sign if φ =  (that is, the rotations R(±n) are identical).
In the next section, this representation of rotations is used to identify SO(3) topologically with three-dimensional real projective space.

Topology

The Lie group SO(3) is diffeomorphic to the real projective space 

Given the above, for every point in this ball there is a rotation, with axis through the point and the origin, and rotation angle equal to the distance of the point from the origin. The identity rotation corresponds to the point at the center of the ball. Rotation through angles between 0 and − correspond to the point on the same axis and distance from the origin but on the opposite side of the origin. The one remaining issue is that the two rotations through  and through − are the same. So we identify (or "glue together") antipodal points on the surface of the ball. After this identification, we arrive at a topological space homeomorphic to the rotation group.

Indeed, the ball with antipodal surface points identified is a smooth manifold, and this manifold is diffeomorphic to the rotation group. It is also diffeomorphic to the real 3-dimensional projective space  so the latter can also serve as a topological model for the rotation group.

These identifications illustrate that SO(3) is connected but not simply connected. As to the latter, in the ball with antipodal surface points identified, consider the path running from the "north pole" straight through the interior down to the south pole. This is a closed loop, since the north pole and the south pole are identified. This loop cannot be shrunk to a point, since no matter how you deform the loop, the start and end point have to remain antipodal, or else the loop will "break open". In terms of rotations, this loop represents a continuous sequence of rotations about the z-axis starting (by example) at identity (center of ball), through south pole, jump to north pole and ending again at the identity rotation (i.e., a series of rotation through an angle φ where φ runs from 0 to 2).

Surprisingly, if you run through the path twice, i.e., run from north pole down to south pole, jump back to the north pole (using the fact that north and south poles are identified), and then again run from north pole down to south pole, so that φ runs from 0 to 4, you get a closed loop which can be shrunk to a single point: first move the paths continuously to the ball's surface, still connecting north pole to south pole twice. The second path can then be mirrored over to the antipodal side without changing the path at all. Now we have an ordinary closed loop on the surface of the ball, connecting the north pole to itself along a great circle. This circle can be shrunk to the north pole without problems. The plate trick and similar tricks demonstrate this practically.

The same argument can be performed in general, and it shows that the fundamental group of SO(3) is the cyclic group of order 2 (a fundamental group with two elements). In physics applications, the non-triviality (more than one element) of the fundamental group allows for the existence of objects known as spinors, and is an important tool in the development of the spin–statistics theorem.

The universal cover of SO(3) is a Lie group called Spin(3). The group Spin(3) is isomorphic to the special unitary group SU(2); it is also diffeomorphic to the unit 3-sphere S3 and can be understood as the group of versors (quaternions with absolute value 1). The connection between quaternions and rotations, commonly exploited in computer graphics, is explained in quaternions and spatial rotations. The map from S3 onto SO(3) that identifies antipodal points of S3 is a surjective homomorphism of Lie groups, with kernel {±1}. Topologically, this map is a two-to-one covering map. (See the plate trick.)

Connection between SO(3) and SU(2)
In this section, we give two different constructions of a two-to-one and surjective homomorphism of SU(2) onto SO(3).

Using quaternions of unit norm 

The group  is isomorphic to the quaternions of unit norm via a map given by

This means that there is a  homomorphism from quaternions of unit norm to the 3D rotation group .

One can work this homomorphism out explicitly: the unit quaternion, with

is mapped to the rotation matrix

The  is apparent since both  and  map to the same .

Using Möbius transformations

The points  on the sphere

The map  is called stereographic projection.

Let the coordinates on  be . The line  passing through  and  can be parametrized as

We have  Hence the map

where, for later convenience, the plane  is identified with the complex plane 

For the inverse, write  as

and demand  to find  and thus

It turns out that  represented in this way by  can be expressed as a matrix  (where the notation is recycled to use the same name for the matrix as for the transformation of  it represents). To identify this matrix, consider first a rotation  about the  through an angle ,

Hence

which, unsurprisingly, is a rotation in the complex plane. In an analogous way, if  is a rotation about the  through an angle , then

which, after a little algebra, becomes

A general Möbius transformation is given by

The Möbius transformations can be represented by matrices

since a common factor of  cancels.

For the same reason, the matrix is not uniquely defined since multiplication by  has no effect on either the determinant or the Möbius transformation. The composition law of Möbius transformations follow that of the corresponding matrices. The conclusion is that each Möbius transformation corresponds to two matrices .

Using this correspondence one may write

These matrices are unitary and thus .

For the general  case, one might use Ref.

The quaternion formulation of the composition of two rotations RB and RA also yields directly the rotation axis and angle of the composite rotation RC = RBRA.

Let the quaternion associated with a spatial rotation R is constructed from its rotation axis S and the rotation angle φ this axis. The associated quaternion is given by,

Then the composition of the rotation RR with RA is the rotation RC = RBRA with rotation axis and angle defined by the product of the quaternions

that is

Expand this product to obtain

Divide both sides of this equation by the identity, which is the law of cosines on a sphere,

and compute

This is Rodrigues' formula for the axis of a composite rotation defined in terms of the axes of the two rotations. He derived this formula in 1840 (see page 408).

The three rotation axes A, B, and C form a spherical triangle and the dihedral angles between the planes formed by the sides of this triangle are defined by the rotation angles.

 Infinitesimal rotations 
The matrices in the Lie algebra are not themselves rotations; the skew-symmetric matrices are derivatives. An actual "differential rotation", or infinitesimal rotation matrix has the form

These matrices do not satisfy all the same properties as ordinary finite rotation matrices under the usual treatment of infinitesimals . To understand what this means, consider

First, test the orthogonality condition, . The product is

differing from an identity matrix by second order infinitesimals, discarded here. So, to first order, an infinitesimal rotation matrix is an orthogonal matrix.

Next, examine the square of the matrix,

Again discarding second order effects, note that the angle simply doubles. This hints at the most essential difference in behavior, which we can exhibit with the assistance of a second infinitesimal rotation,

Since  is second-order, we discard it: thus, to first order, multiplication of infinitesimal rotation matrices is commutative. In fact,

again to first order. In other words, the order in which infinitesimal rotations are applied is irrelevant'''.

This useful fact makes, for example, derivation of rigid body rotation relatively simple. But one must always be careful to distinguish (the first order treatment of) these infinitesimal rotation matrices from both finite rotation matrices and from Lie algebra elements. When contrasting the behavior of finite rotation matrices in the BCH formula above with that of infinitesimal rotation matrices, where all the commutator terms will be second order infinitesimals one finds a bona fide vector space. Technically, this dismissal of any second order terms amounts to Group contraction.

Realizations of rotations

We have seen that there are a variety of ways to represent rotations:
 as orthogonal matrices with determinant 1,
 by axis and rotation angle
 in quaternion algebra with versors and the map 3-sphere S3 → SO(3) (see quaternions and spatial rotations)
 in geometric algebra as a rotor
 as a sequence of three rotations about three fixed axes; see Euler angles.

 Spherical harmonics 

The group  of three-dimensional Euclidean rotations has an infinite-dimensional representation on the Hilbert space

where  are spherical harmonics. Its elements are square integrable complex-valued functions on the sphere. The inner product on this space is given by

If  is an arbitrary square integrable function defined on the unit sphere , then it can be expressed as

where the expansion coefficients are given by

This action is unitary, meaning that

A formula for  valid for all ℓ is given. In this case the space  decomposes neatly into an infinite direct sum of irreducible odd finite-dimensional representations  according to

If  is an infinite-dimensional unitary representation on a separable Hilbert space, then it decomposes as a direct sum of finite-dimensional unitary representations. Such a representation is thus never irreducible. All irreducible finite-dimensional representations  can be made unitary by an appropriate choice of inner product,

Generalizations
The rotation group generalizes quite naturally to n-dimensional Euclidean space,  with its standard Euclidean structure. The group of all proper and improper rotations in n dimensions is called the orthogonal group O(n), and the subgroup of proper rotations is called the special orthogonal group SO(n), which is a Lie group of dimension .

In special relativity, one works in a 4-dimensional vector space, known as Minkowski space rather than 3-dimensional Euclidean space. Unlike Euclidean space, Minkowski space has an inner product with an indefinite signature. However, one can still define generalized rotations which preserve this inner product. Such generalized rotations are known as Lorentz transformations and the group of all such transformations is called the Lorentz group.

The rotation group SO(3) can be described as a subgroup of E+(3), the Euclidean group of direct isometries of Euclidean  This larger group is the group of all motions of a rigid body: each of these is a combination of a rotation about an arbitrary axis and a translation, or put differently, a combination of an element of SO(3) and an arbitrary translation.

In general, the rotation group of an object is the symmetry group within the group of direct isometries; in other words, the intersection of the full symmetry group and the group of direct isometries. For chiral objects it is the same as the full symmetry group.

See also

Orthogonal group
Angular momentum
Coordinate rotations
Charts on SO(3)
Representations of SO(3)
Euler angles
Rodrigues' rotation formula
Infinitesimal rotation
Pin group
Quaternions and spatial rotations
Rigid body
Spherical harmonics
Plane of rotation
Lie group
Pauli matrix
Plate trick
Three-dimensional rotation operator

 Footnotes

 References 

Bibliography

  

 

 

 (translation of the original 1932 edition, Die Gruppentheoretische Methode in Der Quantenmechanik'').

.

Lie groups
Rotational symmetry
Rotation in three dimensions
Euclidean solid geometry